Idiostyla is a genus of moth in the family Cosmopterigidae.  It was discovered in 1921 by Edward Meyrick.  Species include oculata and catharopis.  Both were discovered in Fiji and neither has been catalogued since.

It should not be confused with several species of craneflies bearing the species name idiostyla.

Species
Idiostyla catharopis Meyrick, 1922
Idiostyla oculata Meyrick, 1921

References

Natural History Museum Lepidoptera genus database

Cosmopteriginae
Taxa named by Edward Meyrick
Moth genera